Humberto Solano (9 December 1944 – 18 June 2010) was a Costa Rican cyclist. He competed in the individual road race at the 1968 Summer Olympics.

References

External links
 

1944 births
2010 deaths
Costa Rican male cyclists
Olympic cyclists of Costa Rica
Cyclists at the 1968 Summer Olympics
People from San José, Costa Rica